Wendy Doolan (born 16 December 1968) is a former Australian professional golfer who played mainly on the U.S.-based LPGA Tour.

Doolan was born in Sydney, Australia. She started playing golf at the age of 14. In 1991 she was runner-up at the British Ladies Amateur and she turned professional later that year.

In the early years of her career, Doolan played in Asia and Europe and on the second tier Futures Tour in the United States. She tied for 21st at the 1995 LPGA Final Qualifying Tournament and has played on the LPGA Tour from 1996 to 2012. Her three victories on the Tour came at the 2001 LPGA Champions Classic, the 2003 Welch's/Fry's Championship and the 2004 Evian Masters. The Evian Masters, which is played in France, is the second richest event in women's golf after the U.S. Women's Open, and is recognised as a major championship by the Ladies European Tour. Her best finish in an LPGA major is a tie for seventh place at the 2001 U.S. Women's Open.

Doolan announced her retirement from competitive golf on 10 August 2012. Doolan became a golf teacher after leaving the touring scene.

Professional wins (5)

LPGA Tour wins (3)

1The 2001 LPGA Champions Classic was shortened to 36 holes due to inclement weather.

LPGA Tour playoff record (1–0)

ALPG Tour wins (1)
1992 Heart Health Victorian Women's Open

Futures Tour wins (1)
1992 Inaugural C.C. of Ozark FUTURES Classic

Team appearances
Amateur
Espirito Santo Trophy (representing Australia): 1990
Commonwealth Trophy (representing Australia): 1991
Queen Sirikit Cup (representing Australia): 1990, 1991

Professional
Handa Cup (representing World team): 2014, 2015

References

External links

Australian female golfers
ALPG Tour golfers
LPGA Tour golfers
Sportswomen from New South Wales
Golfers from Sydney
1968 births
Living people
20th-century Australian women